Paidra is a village in Võru Parish, Võru County in southeastern Estonia. The Võhandu River passes through Paidra. There's also a lake situated on the eastern side of the village. Paidra has an area of 5.8 km2 and a population of 42 (as of 31 May 2010).

August Sabbe (1909–1978), who is considered the last surviving Estonian Forest Brother, was born and lived in Paidra by the Võhandu River. Later he also lived in a bunker there in Paidra where he was ambushed and killed at the age of 69.

References

Võru Parish
Villages in Võru County